John "Big Joe" Sichula (4 February 1955 — 1 October 1994 (aged 39)), was a Zambian amateur featherweight and professional super feather/light/light welterweight boxer of the 1970s and '80s who as an amateur qualified for (but withdrew from) the Boxing at the 1976 Summer Olympics in Montreal, Quebec, Canada, won a bronze medal at featherweight at the 1978 All-Africa Games, won the silver medal at featherweight in the Boxing at the 1978 Commonwealth Games in Edmonton, Alberta, Canada losing the final against Azumah Nelson of Ghana, and as a professional won the African Boxing Union (ABU) lightweight title, ABU super featherweight title, and Commonwealth Super featherweight title (3-occasions), and was a challenger for the All African Super Featherweight Title against Sam Akromah, his professional fighting weight varied from , i.e. super featherweight to , i.e. light welterweight.

References

External links

1955 births
1994 deaths
Boxers at the 1978 Commonwealth Games
Commonwealth Games silver medallists for Zambia
Featherweight boxers
Lightweight boxers
Light-welterweight boxers
Place of death missing
Super-featherweight boxers
African Boxing Union champions
Zambian male boxers
Commonwealth Games medallists in boxing
African Games bronze medalists for Zambia
African Games medalists in boxing
Competitors at the 1978 All-Africa Games
Medallists at the 1978 Commonwealth Games